Urosalpinx auroraensis is an extinct species of sea snail, a marine gastropod mollusk in the family Muricidae, the murex snails or rock snails.

Description
The length of the shell attains 16.5 mm.

Distribution
Fossils were found in Pleistocene strata of South Carolina, USA.

References

External links
 Edward J. Petuch (2003) - Cenozoic Seas: The View From Eastern North America

auroraensis
Gastropods described in 1994
Pleistocene gastropods